Moses (Arabic: Musa, Armenian: Movses, Syriac: Mushe) is the name of several bishops:

Moses, bishop of Phacusa in 325, Melitian
Moses, bishop of the Arabs, died c. 389, Nicene
Moses, bishop in Bagrevan in 470s–490s, Armenian
Moses, bishop of Hamir in 486, Nestorian
Moses, bishop of Piroz Shabur in 486, Nestorian
Moses I, bishop of Nahargur in 497, Nestorian
Moses, bishop of Beth Bgash in 544, Nestorian
Moses, bishop of Karka d'Ledan in 576, Nestorian
Moses II, bishop of Nahargur in 585, Nestorian
Moses, bishop of Pelusium in the 7th century, Coptic
Moses, bishop of Hermonthis after 600, Coptic
Moses, bishop of Koptos c. 620, Coptic
Moses, bishop of Nineveh in 659, Nestorian
Moses, bishop of Awsim in 743–767, Coptic
Moses, bishop of Taimana in 790, Nestorian
Moses bar Kepha, died 903, Syriac Orthodox
Moses, bishop of Qlaudia in 965×986, Syriac Orthodox
Moses, bishop of Shigar in 1092, Nestorian
Moses, bishop of Beth Nuhadra in 1111, Nestorian
Moses, bishop of Erbil in 1281, Nestorian
Moses of Mardin, died 1592, Syriac Orthodox